Simon Cohen is a Grammy nominated Australian vocal producer and audio engineer best known for his work on Justin Bieber’s worldwide No. 1 single “Love Yourself”. He has worked with artists including Troye Sivan, Jessica Mauboy, Will.I.am, Guy Sebastian, Justice Crew, Jess Kent, Asta and Indian Summer.

Background

Cohen formed an interest in audio engineering while playing in high school bands, he first broke into the industry through his work on Horrorshow and Spit Syndicate's track 'All Summer Long'. He appeared on Seven Network's 'The Morning Show' with Larry Emdur and Kylie Gillies as well as 2Day FM's Hit 30 program in 2016 to discuss his collaboration with Bieber. In 2020 Cohen and Studios 301 launched their 'pay it forward' initiative, allowing musicians to gift a free online audio mix to an artist of their choice.

Awards and nominations

Grammy Awards
{| class="wikitable plainrowheaders" style="width:70%;
|-
! scope="col" style="width:4%;"| Year
! scope="col" style="width:50%;"| Category
! scope="col" style="width:35%;"| Nominated work
! scope="col" style="width:35%;"| Role
! scope="col" style="width:6%;"| Result
! scope="col" style="width:6%;"| 
|-
! rowspan="8" | 2016
| Album of the Year
| rowspan="2"| Justin Bieber “Purpose“
| rowspan="2"| Producer
| 
| rowspan="8"|
|-

Reference section

External links section
 Official Website
 

Living people
Australian audio engineers
Australian record producers
Year of birth missing (living people)